Sedimentitalea nanhaiensis is a Gram-negative, rod-shaped, aerobic and motile bacterium from the genus of Sedimentitalea which has been isolated from sediments from the South China Sea in China.

References 

Rhodobacteraceae
Bacteria described in 2010